Cornwallis was launched in 1812 at Calcutta and lost in 1822 at Île de France (Mauritius). She first appears in Lloyd's Register for 1818 with J. Charitie, master and owner, and trade London—India. The Register of Shipping for  1822 gives her master as Charitte, and her trade as London—Bengal.

She was lost in 1822. She sailed from Calcutta on or about 20 January 1822, bound for Mauritius. She was "spoken to" on or about 18 February, southward of the Line, but not seen again.

Citations and references
Citations

References
Hackman, Rowan (2001) Ships of the East India Company. (Gravesend, Kent: World Ship Society). 
Phipps, John, (of the Master Attendant's Office, Calcutta), (1840) A Collection of Papers Relative to Ship Building in India ...: Also a Register Comprehending All the Ships ... Built in India to the Present Time .... (Scott).

1812 ships
British ships built in India
Age of Sail merchant ships
Merchant ships of the United Kingdom
Maritime incidents in 1822
Shipwrecks in the Indian Ocean
Ships lost with all hands
Missing ships